Metaphysical Interior with Large Factory (1916–17) is a painting by the Italian metaphysical painter Giorgio de Chirico. It is part of a series that extended late into de Chirico's career.

Like the other works in this series it depicts a small room cluttered with surreal objects. This time the main focus is a framed picture of a factory complex.

Paintings by Giorgio de Chirico
1910s paintings